Paul-Joseph Delcloche, a Flemish painter of interiors and battle-pieces, was born at Namur in 1716. He was the son of Pierre Delcloche, an almost unknown painter, from whom he received his first lessons in art. Whilst still very young he went to Paris, but returned in 1747 to Liège, where he painted some pictures for the Salle des États and the churches. His small pictures are full of life and spirit, but his larger works are much less successful. He died in 1759.

References
 

1716 births
1759 deaths
18th-century Flemish painters
People from Namur (city)